The 33rd General Assembly of Prince Edward Island was in session from April 5, 1898, to November 12, 1900. The Liberal Party led by Alexander Bannerman Warburton formed the government. In August 1898, Donald Farquharson became Liberal party leader and Premier.

There were three sessions of the 33rd General Assembly:

James H. Cummiskey was elected speaker.

Members

Kings

Prince

Queens

Notes:

External links
  Election results for the Prince Edward Island Legislative Assembly, 1897-07-28
 Prince Edward Island, garden province of Canada, WH Crosskill (1904)

Terms of the General Assembly of Prince Edward Island
1898 establishments in Prince Edward Island
1900 disestablishments in Prince Edward Island